Naḥman Isaac Fischmann (–1873), also known by the pen name Ha-nif ha-kohen mi-Lvov, was a Galician Hebrew-language writer, dramatist, poet, and editor.

He was a member of the young Haskalah group in Lemberg, best known for his Biblical dramas Mapelet Sisra (1841) and Kesher Shevna (1870).

Fischmann's other publications include Eshkol ʻanavim, a collection of original Hebrew poems and translations (Lemberg, 1827), Safah le-ne'emanim, a comprehensive commentary on Job (Lemberg, 1854), and the poem Ha-et ve-ha-meshorer (Lemberg, 1870). He was also a contributor to the literary publications 'Bikkure ha-Ittim and Yerushalayim ha-benuya''.

Bibliography

References
 

19th-century births
1873 deaths
19th-century Austrian dramatists and playwrights
Austrian Empire Jews
Austrian male dramatists and playwrights
Austro-Hungarian Jews
Hebrew-language playwrights
Hebrew-language poets
Jewish dramatists and playwrights
Jewish poets
Jews from Galicia (Eastern Europe)
Literary editors
People from the Kingdom of Galicia and Lodomeria
People of the Haskalah
Writers from Lviv